Ella T. Grasso Southeastern Technical High School, or Grasso Tech, is a technical high school located in Groton, Connecticut. It is in the Connecticut Technical High School System. It receives students from many nearby towns.

The school is named after Ella T. Grasso, the first woman elected governor of Connecticut.

Technologies
In addition to a complete academic program leading to a high school diploma, students attending Grasso Tech receive training in one of the following trades and technologies:

Automotive Collision Repair and Refinishing
Automotive Technology
Bioscience and Environmental Technology
Culinary Arts
Digital Media and Audio Production
Electrical
Hairdressing and Cosmetology
Information Systems Technology
Mechanical Design and Engineering Technology
Plumbing and Heating
Tourism, Hospitality and Guest Services Management

Carpentry was a trade available for students to take, however, starting in the 2016–2017 school year, it is unavailable for students to choose as their shop.

As of the 2016–2017 school year, culinary arts and hospitality have combined into one shop named culinary and guest services.

As of the new school being built in 2019, Digital Media and Audio Production has been introduced as a new shop.

References

External links
 

Buildings and structures in Groton, Connecticut
Public high schools in Connecticut
Schools in New London County, Connecticut